List of gardens in Ireland open to the public:
Achill Secret Garden, 
Avondale House, 
Altamont Gardens, 
Bay Garden,  (Closed indefinitely as of 2022)
Belvedere House and Gardens, 
Birr Castle, 
Camas Park, 
Coolaught Gardens, 
Coolwater Garden  
Dillon Garden,  (Closed indefinitely as of 2022)
Derreen Garden, 
Emo Court, 
Fernhill House Hotel & Gardens, Clonakilty, Co. Cork 
Fernhill Park and Gardens, Dublin, 
Glenveagh, 
Glebe House and Gallery, 
Huntingbrook Gardens, 
Huntington Castle Gardens, 
Ilnacullin (Garinish or Garnish Island)
Irish National Botanic Gardens
Irish National War Memorial Gardens
Japanese Gardens, 
John F. Kennedy Arboretum, 
Johnstown Castle, 
June Blake's Garden, 
Kells Bay Gardens, 
Kilfane, 
Kilmokea, 
Killruddery, 
Kilmacurragh, 
Knockpatrick Gardens, Foynes, Co. Limerick, 
Larchill, 
Lissadell, 
Lodge Park, Straffan, 
Loftus Hall walled gardens, 
Mount Congreve Garden, 
Mount Usher Gardens, 
Muckross, 
National Garden Exhibition Centre, 
Newtownbarry House Gardens, 
Oakfield Park, 
Powerscourt Estate, 
Ram House Gardens, 
Rathmichael Lodge, 
Talbot Gardens, Malahide, 
Terra Nova Garden, 
Tombrick Garden,

See also
Conservation in Ireland
Gardens in Northern Ireland
Historic Cork Gardens
List of gardens
List of botanical gardens 
List of Conservation topics

References
 The Hidden Gardens of Ireland, Marianne Heron, Gill and Macmillan, Dublin 1993 
 O'Brien Guide to Irish Gardens, Shirley lanigan, O'Brien press, Dublin, 2001 
 The Gardens of Ireland, Jack Whaley, Poolbeg Press Limited, Dublin, 1990  
 Houses, Castles and Gardens of Ireland,